The Chinese Ambassador to Angola is the official representative of the People's Republic of China to the Republic of Angola.

List of representatives

See also
Ambassadors of China

References
 驻安哥拉历任大使 (Chinese)

External links
Embassy of China in Angola (Chinese)

Angola
Angola
China